Viewer's Choice may refer to:

 In Demand, a US-based pay-per-view service formerly known as Viewer's Choice
 MTV Video Music Award - Viewer's Choice
 Viewers Choice, a Canadian-based pay-per-view service